Archug is a rural locality (a selo) in Kondiksky Selsoviet, Khivsky District, Republic of Dagestan, Russia. The population was 109 as of 2010.

Geography 
Archug is located 12 km northwest of Khiv (the district's administrative centre) by road. Kondik is the nearest rural locality.

References 

Rural localities in Khivsky District